The Bell 214ST is a medium-lift, twin-engine helicopter descended from Bell Helicopter's ubiquitous UH-1 Huey series.  Though it shares a type number with the somewhat-related Bell 214, the 214ST is larger and of quite different appearance.

Design and development
The Bell 214ST was originally developed as a military project from the Bell 214B BigLifter, specifically for production in Iran and the development by Bell was funded by the Iranian government. The fundamental difference was the replacement of the Model 214's single Lycoming LTC-4 turboshaft engine with two  General Electric T700 engines, to improve the helicopter's hot and high performance and improve safety. Iran changed its production plans, with 50 Bell 214A and 350 214STs to be built at the new production plant to be set up  at Isfahan, Iran.

Work started on three conforming prototypes in 1978.  The overthrow of the Shah in 1979 resulted in the cancellation of Iran's orders. By this time the new helicopter had attracted sufficient interest from other potential customers for Bell to continue with the project and build the 214ST at their Dallas-Fort Worth facility instead. As a result, it was launched as a civil helicopter, rather than a military one.

The first of the three full 214ST prototypes flew on 21 July 1979. Manufacturing of production 214STs began in 1981. Type certification from the FAA and CAA for visual and instrument flight rules was awarded in 1982. The military variant followed into production with helicopter deliveries commencing in 1982.

The Bell 214ST included major design changes from the Bell 214. The Bell 214ST has a larger, stretched fuselage with seating for 16-18 passengers, and two  GE CT7-2A engines. The helicopter introduced some ground-breaking innovations for Bell, including a one-hour run-dry transmission, fiberglass rotor blades, elastomeric rotorhead bearings, and the option of either skid or wheeled landing gear. The helicopter has a cockpit door and a large cabin door on each side. The 214ST has a fuel capacity of 435 US gallons (1,650 L).  An auxiliary fuel system could be added.

The Model 214ST was the largest helicopter that had been built by Bell at that time (since surpassed by the Bell 525 Relentless) The ST was originally an acronym for "Stretched Twin", but was later changed to "Super Transporter". Bell built a total of 96 214STs with production ending in 1993.

The military operators included Iraq (48), Brunei (1), Peru (11), Thailand (9) and Venezuela (4).

Operators

Military operators
 

Royal Brunei Air Force  

 Peruvian Air Force

Civil operators

 Helicopter Transport Services

 Presidential Airways
 Evergreen Helicopters

 Ministry of Land, Infrastructure, Transport and Tourism

Former operators

 CHC Helikopter Service
 
Iraqi Air Force

 Royal Thai Navy

  British Caledonian Helicopters
 Bristow Helicopters

Venezuelan Air Force

Aircraft on display
United States
Flying Leatherneck Aviation Museum at MCAS Miramar, California

Specifications (214ST)

See also

References

 "A Big Lifter From Bell". Air International. Vol. 23, No. 4, October 1982. pp. 163–169.
 Lambert, Mark. "214ST: Bell's Super Transport". Flight International. Vol. 115, No. 3667. 30 June 1979. pp. 2345–2348.

External links

214ST
1970s United States civil utility aircraft
1970s United States helicopters
Twin-turbine helicopters
Aircraft first flown in 1977